Live Phish 04.04.98 is the third night of the four-night "Island Tour", recorded live at the Providence Civic Center in Providence, Rhode Island, on April 4, 1998.

The short mini-run quickly became one of the most popular Phish performances of all time, with the band mixing the funk of 1997 with the high-energy jams of the mid-1990s along with brand new compositions.

The first show in Rhode Island will always be remembered for its extended jams (even "Birds of a Feather" clocked in at 15 minutes). Highlights include a heavy, energetic 18-minute "Ghost" and one of the most celebrated versions of "Harry Hood" of the late 1990s. After a 12-minute "Brother", guitarist Trey Anastasio says the band will now play the "radio friendly" version, resulting in a humorous ten-second version of the song.  Before the band played the next song, "Ghost", they inform the audience that the song is "radio un-friendly, because it's really long, and really slow".

In addition to being a CD release, this concert is available as a download in FLAC and MP3 formats at LivePhish.com.

Track listing

Disc one

Set one:
 "Tweezer" (Anastasio, Fishman, Gordon, McConnell) – 16:58 →
 "Taste" (Anastasio, Fishman, Gordon, Marshall, McConnell) – 11:07
 "Bouncing Around the Room" (Anastasio, Marshall) – 3:49
 "Funky Bitch" (Seals) – 6:57
 "Ginseng Sullivan" (Blake) – 4:35
 "Limb by Limb" (Anastasio, Herman, Marshall) – 10:06
 "Lawn Boy" (Anastasio, Marshall) – 2:59
 "Character Zero" (Anastasio, Marshall) – 8:31

Disc two

Set two:
 "Birds of a Feather" (Anastasio, Fishman, Gordon, Marshall, McConnell) – 15:57 →
 "2001" (Deodato) – 16:40 →
 "Brother" (Anastasio, Fishman, Gordon, McConnell) – 12:35
 "Brother" (Anastasio, Fishman, Gordon, McConnell) – 1:02

Disc three

Set two, continued:
 "Ghost" (Anastasio, Marshall) – 17:49 →
 "The Lizards" (Anastasio) – 12:27
 "David Bowie" (Anastasio) – 16:25
Encore:
 "Harry Hood" (Anastasio, Fishman, Gordon, Long, McConnell) – 16:40

Personnel

Trey Anastasio – guitars, lead vocals
Page McConnell – piano, organ, backing vocals, lead vocals on "Lawn Boy"
Mike Gordon – bass, backing vocals, lead vocals on "Funky Bitch" and "Ginseng Sullivan"
Jon Fishman – drums, backing vocals, co-lead vocals on "Taste"

References

26
1998.04.04
2005 live albums
Elektra Records live albums